Mind Lords of the Last Sea is an accessory for the 2nd edition of the Advanced Dungeons & Dragons fantasy role-playing game, published in 1996.

Contents
Mind Lords of the Last Sea is part of the "Wanderer's Chronicles" line for the Dark Sun setting, which details areas of Athas far from the city of Tyr. Mind Lords of the Last Sea describes the location and includes an introductory adventure for the area, and is split into two books and also comes with a fold-out color map.

It depicts a society isolated for thousands of years from the remainder of Athas by the will of three psionicists who have become immortal. Things are quiet around the Last Sea, especially in the city of the Mind Lords, where people are required to be happy by decree; mental harmonization awaits anyone who becomes restless. A body of water as large as the Last Sea is unheard of on Athas, and involves new rules, equipment, and modes of behavior. Detailed are the beach druids, who spend their time surfing and seeking fulfillment in catching the perfect wave. In the included adventure, the player characters must track down the missing brain of one of their number.

Publication history
Mind Lords of the Last Sea was published by TSR in 1996.

Reception
Cliff Ramshaw reviewed Mind Lords of the Last Sea for Arcane magazine, rating it a 4 out of 10 overall. Ramshaw compared Mind Lords of the Last Sea to Windriders of the Jagged Cliffs, which he reviewed at the same time, saying that "Mind Lords, by comparison, fails to convince". He called the included adventure "poor" as the player's first experience of the Last Sea area, complaining that there is hardly anything to kill and that most of the characters' time is spent tracking down the missing brain: "It's one of those adventures where the very existence of the entire realm hangs in the balance, which is all very well for high-level characters, but it seems over-the-top for new arrivals on the scene. And, to top it all, the characters' actions don't affect the outcome. If they succeed (or rather fail, since there's a time-travel twist involved) then all's fine; if they fail, then a super-powerful Mind Lord comes along to set everything to rights anyway. Contrived and pointless."

References

Dark Sun supplements
Role-playing game supplements introduced in 1996